Johannes Sering or Johannes Seringius (died 1631) was a chaplain to Anne of Denmark in Scotland and England

Sering was a graduate of Rostock University where he had studied under David Chytraeus. His 1585 matriculation record says he was from Thuringia. He was a member of the Lutheran church.

In Scotland
As part of the marriage negotiations of Anne of Denmark and James VI of Scotland the Danish council requested that she was allowed the freedom of religion and worship of her choice, and to keep a preacher at the expense of the Scottish exchequer, and recruit a successor as she wishes. The preacher was to be Danish or German. Though both kingdoms had adopted forms of Protestantism, Denmark was a Lutheran country while Scotland had become Calvinist.

James VI of Scotland travelled to meet Anne of Denmark. On 25 November 1589 he had lunch with Sering and his own preacher David Lindsay, as guests of Jens Nilssøn, Bishop of Oslo. James VI interviewed Sering promising him an annual stipend of 200 dalers and another 40 dalers for the wages of two servants for, "the instruction of our Sovereign lady his highness's dearest spouse in the true religion".

Sering, the "Dens minister" (Danish preacher), was paid a yearly fee of £600 in three termly installments from the Scottish exchequer.

David Chrytraeus wrote to him in October 1590.

Sering may have written frequently to the court of Denmark with news of Scotland and the queen. One of his surviving letters to the Danish council seems to allude to this role.

On 25 May 1595 he wrote the Council of Denmark, asking if he could leave Scotland and be a church minister in Denmark. He mentioned that the queen now could now speak Scots as fluently as any noblewoman. However, he stayed in the queen's service and came with her to England in 1603.

In April 1597 he attended the baptism of Lucretia, the daughter of George Littlejohn. He married Anna Ellis or Ebbes, a Danish servant of the queen on 28 April 1598. The queen paid for their wedding banquet at Holyrood Palace, and the household accounts recorded the day as the wedding of "Hairy Hans" and "Little Anna".

In England
The Duke of Holstein, who visited England in 1605, promised Anna Ebbis she would have an annual pension of £50, but she later had to write a petition for payment.

On 25 July 1607 he was granted denization in England, and was described as a subject of the Prince of Weimar.

Little Anna died on 26 February 1608, and was buried at St Margaret's, Westminster, where Sering had a ledger stone placed with a Latin epitaph.

In 1611 he petitioned for the mastership of the hospital of Newport Pagnell, which was part of the queen's jointure. Sering, recorded as the "Dutch chaplain" had a royal annuity of £50 per year from 11 February 1621. In 1622 he sent a petition for payment to the Lord Treasurer, Lionel Cranfield. He received a pension of £80 yearly. In 1626 he wrote a Latin poem for the coronation of Charles I of England to accompany another petition for arrears of his pension.

He died in 1631 and was buried at St Margaret's, Westminster, leaving a widow, Grace.

Fredererick Sering
A man called "Frederick Searing" or "Serings", locksmith or turner (carpenter), also appears in lists of the queen's household. In patments of February 1608 he may be linked with George Davies, a coffer maker. It is unclear if this man was a relation to Johannes Sering.

References

Further reading
 Jemma Field, 'Anna of Denmark and the Politics of Religious Identity in Jacobean Scotland and England, c. 1592-1619', Northern Studies, 50 (2019), pp. 87-113
 SSNE database: SERING, JOHANNES (SSNE 4738)

1631 deaths
Court of James VI and I
Household of Anne of Denmark
University of Rostock alumni
Clergy from Thuringia
Danish Lutheran clergy